Charpentier River is a river in northern Quebec (Ungava Peninsula), Canada, that flows from Lac Nedlouc for about  northwest to Lake Minto. A rarely paddled river, it flows through tundra & taiga. It has several waterfalls, namely Chutes de Burin and Chute Bleu. It is one of the main tributaries of the Leaf River.

References

Rivers of Nord-du-Québec
Nunavik